Jonathan Laurence Marchini (born 19 May 1973) is a Bayesian statistician and professor of statistical genomics in the Department of Statistics at the University of Oxford, a tutorial fellow in statistics at Somerville College, Oxford and a co-founder and director of Gensci Ltd. He co-leads the Haplotype Reference Consortium.

Education 

He obtained a Bachelor of Science degree in Pure Mathematics and Mathematical Statistics from Exeter University from 1991-94. He then obtained a PGCE in Mathematics Education from the West Sussex Institute of Higher Education from 1994-5. He completed his DPhil in the Department of Statistics at the University of Oxford supervised by Professor Brian Ripley from 1998-2002.

Career and research 

Marchini spent three years working as a VSO volunteer teaching A-level Mathematics at Tosamaganga Secondary school, near Iringa, Tanzania, between September 1995 and September 1998.

From 2002 to 2005 he held a Wellcome Trust Training Fellowship in Mathematical Biology, under the supervision of Prof Lon Cardon and Prof Peter Donnelly.

In 2006 he was appointed as a university lecturer (associate professor) in statistical genomics in the Department of Statistics at the University of Oxford and a senior research fellow at Mansfield College. In 2007 he became an affiliated group leader at the Wellcome Trust Center of Human Genetics at the University of Oxford. In 2010 he was re-appointed until retirement 

In 2015 he was promoted to professor of statistical genomics

Marchini's research focusses on statistical genetics and population genetics, with a particular emphasis on methods development for genome-wide association studies. He has worked on haplotype estimation, genotype imputation, genotype calling from arrays and sequencing, sparse tensor decomposition for RNA-seq datasets, population structure, phenotype prediction and mixed models, gene-gene interactions and brain imaging genetics.

He was a member of the analysis team for the International HapMap Project, the Wellcome Trust Case-Control Consortium, the 1000 Genomes Project and the UK10K Project. His research group was responsible for the haplotype estimation and genotype imputation for the UK Biobank dataset. He co-leads the Haplotype Reference Consortium.

He has been an ISI Highly Cited Researcher from 2014-2018

He has acted as an expert witness in a patent trial

Awards 

In 2012 he was awarded a Philip Leverhulme Prize for "leading the way by constructing powerful and ingenious novel statistical methodology for population and medical genetics, together with associated fast
computational algorithms and software."

References

External links 
 

1977 births
Living people
Alumni of the University of Oxford
Fellows of Somerville College, Oxford
British statisticians
Alumni of the University of Exeter
Biostatisticians